Þórður  is an Icelandic given name. Notable people with the name include:

Þórður Friðjónsson (Thordur Fridjonsson), (1952–2011), Vice President of Iceland Stock Exchange and President of NASDAQ OMX Iceland
Þórður Guðjónsson, (Thordur Gudjonsson), (born 1973), footballer
Þórður Helgason (born 1947), writer and educator
Þórður kakali Sighvatsson (died 1256), 13th century chieftain during the Age of the Sturlungs
Þórður Þórðarson (1930–2002), footballer
Þórður Þórðarson (born 1972), footballer 

Icelandic masculine given names